Nancy Roberts (1924–2008) was often described as the "First Lady of American Folklore." She was not only a best selling author but a superb storyteller, presenting storytelling programs and lectures on creative writing at clubs, public libraries, schools, and universities. The author of over two dozen books, Roberts began writing ghost stories for the Charlotte Observer. Carl Sandburg encouraged her to publish her stories as a book. In 1958 she followed his advice and her books have sold over one million copies earning her national recognition including a nomination for the Great Western Writers iSpur Award and a certificate of commendation from the American Association for State and Local History.

Southern Living magazine described her as the "custodian of the twilight zone."

Nancy Roberts, née Nancy MacRae Correll, was born in Milwaukee, Wisconsin to Milton Correll and Maud MacRae. Her family was originally from North Carolina and Nancy returned to the state in the 1950s. Early in her career, she owned a newspaper in Maxton, North Carolina called the Scottish Chief. During this time, she hired photographer Bruce Roberts to work on the paper. They subsequently married but divorced in the 1980s. They had two children. Her next marriage to Jim Brown lasted 30 years, until her death. They enjoyed traveling around the country researching material for her books. She was also a devout Christian and became an ordained minister during this time. She continued writing books and stories until a few months before her death on July 1, 2008. Her final resting place is at Sharon Memorial Cemetery in Charlotte, North Carolina.

Books by Nancy Roberts 

 America's Most Haunted Places by Bruce Roberts, Nancy Roberts (Garden City, N.Y. : Doubleday, 1976) , OCLC: 1531988
 Animal Ghost Stories by Nancy Roberts (Little Rock, Arkansas : August House, 1995) , OCLC: 32311899
 Appalachian Ghosts by Nancy Roberts (Garden City, N.Y. : Doubleday, 1978) 
 Blackbeard and Other Pirates of the Atlantic Coast by Nancy Roberts (Winston-Salem, NC : J.F. Blair, ©1993) , OCLC: 27725606
 Blackbeard's Cat, Library of Congress Card Catalog Number 98-068229
 Civil War Ghost Stories and Legends by Nancy Roberts (Columbia, S.C. : University of South Carolina Press, ©1992) , OCLC: 25628262
 David by Nancy Roberts, Bruce Roberts (Richmond, Virginia : John Knox Press [1968]) OCLC: 437075
 The Faces of South Carolina by Nancy Roberts (Garden City, N.Y. : Doubleday, 1976) , OCLC: 2121061
 Georgia Ghosts by Nancy Roberts (Winston-Salem N.C. : John F. Blair, Publisher, ©1997) , OCLC: 36807527
 Ghosts and Specters: ten supernatural stories by Bruce Roberts, Nancy Roberts (Garden City, N.Y. : Doubleday [1974]) , OCLC: 802872
 Ghosts from the Coast by Nancy Roberts (Chapel Hill, North Carolina : University of North Carolina Press, ©2001) , OCLC: 46634396
 Ghosts of the Carolinas by Nancy Roberts (Columbia, S.C. : University of South Carolina Press, ©1988) , OCLC: 18351912
 Ghosts of the Southern Mountains and Appalachia by Nancy Roberts (Columbia, South Carolina : University of South Carolina Press, ©1988) , OCLC: 18380668
 Ghosts of the Wild West by Nancy Roberts (Columbia : University of South Carolina Press, ©2008) , OCLC: 183879290
 The Gold Seekers : gold, ghosts, and legends from Carolina to California by Nancy Roberts (Columbia, S.C. : University of South Carolina Press, ©1989) , OCLC: 20264555
 Goodliest Land by Nancy Roberts, Bruce Roberts (Garden City, New York : Doubleday, 1973) , OCLC: 707066
 The Governor by Nancy Roberts, Bruce Roberts (Charlotte [N.C.] McNally and Loftin, 1972) OCLC: 417067
 Haunted houses : tales from 30 American homes by Nancy Roberts (Chester, Conn.: Globe Pequot Press, ©1988) , OCLC: 16466049
 The Haunted South by Nancy Roberts (New York : Barnes & Noble, Inc., by arrangement with Univ. of South Carolina Press, 1996) , OCLC: 37104698
 North Carolina Ghosts and Legends by Nancy Roberts (Columbia, South Carolina : University of South Carolina Press, ©1991) , OCLC: 23462085
 South Carolina ghosts : from the coast to the mountains by Nancy Roberts (Columbia, S.C. : University of South Carolina Press, ©1983) , OCLC: 10752542
 Southern Ghosts by Nancy Roberts, Bruce Roberts (Garden City, New York : Doubleday, ©1979) , OCLC: 4884172

Visual Material by Nancy Roberts 
 Pirates of the Carolinas by Nancy Roberts Southeastern Filmstrips, Inc.; Nancy Roberts Southern Collection (Charlotte, NC : Nancy Roberts Southern Collection, Ltd., ©1980), OCLC: 26245369

References

20th-century American women writers
1924 births
2008 deaths
21st-century American women